Frank Burnett Searle (20 January 1906 – 16 June 1977) was an English footballer who played in the Football League for Bristol City, Charlton Athletic, Chester, Clapton Orient, Watford and Stoke.

Career statistics
Source:

References

1906 births
1977 deaths
People from Hednesford
English footballers
Association football fullbacks
Association football wing halves
Stoke City F.C. players
Hednesford Town F.C. players
Willenhall F.C. players
Bristol City F.C. players
Charlton Athletic F.C. players
Chester City F.C. players
Watford F.C. players
Leyton Orient F.C. players
English Football League players